The Rocket Festival  is a merit-making ceremony traditionally practiced by ethnic Lao people near the beginning of the wet season in numerous villages and municipalities, in the regions of Northeastern Thailand and Laos. Celebrations typically include  music and dance performances, competitive processions of floats, dancers and musicians on the second day, and culminating on the third day in competitive firing of home-made rockets.  Local participants and sponsors use the occasion to enhance their social prestige, as is customary in traditional Buddhist folk festivals throughout Southeast Asia.

Bun Bang Fai is celebrated in all provinces across Laos, but the most popular one used to be held along the bank of the Mekong river in the capital, Vientiane. However, because of considerable urbanization in recent decades and for safety measures, the festivals are now celebrated in nearby villages, including Naxon, Natham, Thongmang, Ban Kern, and Pakkagnoung. As these festivals are celebrated at varying dates, they each attract a large crowd from the capital Vientiane.

The festival in Thailand also includes special programs and specific local patterns like Bang Fai (Parade dance) and a Beautiful Bang Fai float such as Yasothon on the third weekend of May, and continues Suwannaphum District, Roi Et on the first weekend of June, Phanom Phrai District Roi Et during the full moon of the seventh month in Lunar year's calendar each year.
The Bang Fai festival is not only found in Isan or Northeasthern Thailand and North Thailand and Laos, but also in Amphoe Sukhirin, Narathiwat.

History

These Buddhist festivals are presumed to have evolved from pre-Buddhist fertility rites held to celebrate and encourage the coming of the rains, from before the 9th century invention of black powder. This festival displays some earthy elements of Lao folklore. Coming immediately prior to the planting season, the festivals offer an excellent chance to make merry before the hard work begins, as well as enhancing communal prestige, and attracting and redistributing wealth as in any gift culture.

Scholars study the centuries-old rocket festival tradition today as it may be significant to the history of rocketry in the East, and perhaps also significant in the postcolonial socio-political development of the Southeast Asian nation states. Economically, villages and sponsors bear the costs in many locations in Laos and in northern Isan (northeast Thailand). The festivals typically begin at the beginning of the rainy season, in the sixth or seventh lunar months.

Anthropology Professor Charles F. Keyes advises, "In recognition of the deep-seated meaning of certain traditions for the peoples of the societies of mainland Southeast Asia, the rulers of these societies have incorporated some indigenous symbols into the national cultures that they have worked to construct in the postcolonial period.  Giving the "Bun Bang Fai or fire rocket festival of Laos" as one example, he adds that it remains "…far more elaborate in the villages than in the cities…."

Present day in Laos
Bun Bang Fai originates from ancient times when ethnic Lao people believed in many gods and is mentioned in tales, such as ‘The Tale of Pha Daeng–Nang Ai and ‘The Tale of Phaya Khankhak.’ These stories refer to the firing of rockets to the heavens to communicate with the God of Rain and persuade him to send the rains in the earth in a timely fashion for cultivation.

Early European explorers passing through Laos in 1800s recorded witnessing the rocket festivals in the country. Louis de Carné, in 1866, described a celebration in southern Laos, where bamboos loaded with powder went off, producing violent explosions.  Furthermore, Etienne Aymonier, visiting Laos in 1883, described Bang Phoai (Bang Fai) as strong tubes of bamboo fretted with cords, rattans, in which powder was stuffed. The powder was manufactured in the country by mixing ten parts of saltpeter (potassium nitrate) with three of wood charcoal and a part and half of sulphur. These rockets were prepared in advance and then deposited on trestles at the pagoda. The rockets were paraded around the temple before their launching the next day. The celebration, which occurred in May or June, was boisterous with people playing music, singing, dancing, and getting drunk. 

Today in Laos, Bun Bang Fai is well-preserved and remains steeped in the Lao folklore and one of the most important traditional festivals celebrated in villages and towns across Laos. It is also celebrated by Lao communities living outside of Laos, most of them in the United States and in France.

Bun Bang Fai in Laos
Bun Bang Fai is held over the sixth Lunar month, usually around May and June, coinciding with the plantation and the beginning of the rainy seasons. Several months before the festival, an organizing committee is formed in each future host village to discuss about all aspects of the festival, including inviting other villages, establishing rules and safety measures and setting criteria and prizes for the best rockets. Weeks before the festival, bamboo rockets are built and decorated by monks and villagers. They vary in size from small to very large rockets that hold gunpowder from less than 12 kilograms to 120 kilograms.

The festival usually lasts two days and begins early in the morning with the associated religious ritual by the monks in the temple. Early in the afternoon a buddhist procession kicks off in which villagers carrying money trees  circle three times the central ordination hall where sits a buddha statue in a clockwise rotation on the sound of traditional music. The money trees are then offered to the monks in a Buddhist ritual believed to garner religious merit. Afterwards, rockets from all involved villages are displayed in the court of the temple followed by a celebration with traditional music and dance that can last up to the early morning of the next day.

The second day begins with a morning ceremony of food offering from faithful villagers to the monks in the assembly hall of the temple. The food usually includes sticky rice, cakes, and other sweets that the faithful line up to place in the monks’ alms-bowls during the sermon. In addition, other food dishes are portioned out in small bowls and are offered to the monks on rattan trays. The religious leader of the village ritually presents the food to the monks by reciting the five precepts of buddhism. The monks, in return, offer the teachings of the Buddha by chanting sutras and sermon. During the sermon, the faithful address prayers to their ancestors, and do the Yaat Nam which consists of having water blessed by a monk before pouring it, drop by drop, on the earth. After the ceremony a meal is shared by all participants. The faithful believe these offerings grant long life to anyone who gives with a serene heart.

The religious ceremony is followed by a boisterous street parade through the village with floats and pickup trucks displaying the rockets on the sound of the Khene, cymbals and long drums. Teams of contestants dance and chant traditional folksongs, with the team's leader chanting first and then the others repeating. The songs are poetic in nature and use sexual themes that symbolize the relationships between heaven and earth as well as between men and women. The parade ends at the temple and the rockets are carried to the communal launch-pad for joining a contest at the outskirt of the village. Contestants are divided into groups based on the size of their rocket.

The competition begins with the firing of the rockets skywards in the applause of the joyful crowd. For each rocket category, scores are given based on how high and far the rocket flies. The higher and farther a rocket goes, the bigger the score and praise for its builder. Builders of failed rockets are thrown in a muddy pond and forced to drink Lao rice alcohol or Lao-Lao. Prizes are also given to categories for the most beautiful decoration and the best entertaining performance. In most of Laos, the festival remains largely a community affair that brings people from different villages. It promotes unity and friendship within and among village communities and helps maintain their close relationships.

Bun Bang Fai is celebrated in all provinces across Laos, with Luang Prabang, Xieng Khuang, Savanakhet, and villages around the capital city Vientiane being the sites for the biggest celebrations. Another popular Bun Bang Fai is celebrated at the outskirt of Vang Vieng, a resort town with its stunning surrounding limestone mountains that attracts many visitors from nearby villages and the capital Vientiane. In 2013, the Vangvieng's Bun Bang Fai was featured in the movie in Lao language “The Rocket (2013 film)”. In the film, a young boy named Ahlo wanted to enter the rocket making contest hoping to win a big cash prize and to prove once and for all he's not cursed. The movie received praises and prizes at several international film festivals.

Lao Bun Bang Fai in the United States and in France
Following the end of the Vietnam war in 1975 and the change of government regime in Laos, tens of thousands of Lao people left the country as refugees who resettled in other countries, most of them in the United States and in France. In their newly adopted countries, they formed Lao communities and built Lao buddhist temples to serve as community and cultural centers. Traditional Lao holidays such as Lao New Year and Bun Bang Fai are celebrated in addition to the official host countries’ holidays.

In France, Bun Bang Fai is celebrated in Paris, Marseille, Lille, Strasbourg, Montpellier, and other cities that have Wat Lao and a large community of Laotians in France. But the most important Bun Bang Fai has been celebrated at Wat Lao Bouddhanimit in Bretignolles, a small town located in the Nouvelle-Aquitaine region in the west of France. Each year, this festival brings together participants from Lao communities from the various regions of France. In the United States there are more than forty Wat Lao as there are many Laotian Americans living in states like California, Minnesota, Washington, and others. Around the Spring of each year, the Lao communities gather to celebrate Bun Bang Fai in Wat Lao in these states.

The celebration in both the United States and France lasts two days and proceeds as in Laos, beginning with a religious ceremony followed by a display and parade of rockets in the Wat with traditional Lao dance on the sound of Soeng Bang Fai music. Unlike in Laos, however, the procession does not conclude in the firing of the rockets as they are not allowed to be launched because of safety measures. Instead, only very small hand-crafted rockets are launched by those who carry them about.

 These Bun Bang Fai provide an excellent opportunity to bring together people from Lao communities living in their respective new countries, the United States and France, to interact, reunite and have fun together. Furthermore, people from non-Lao communities, buddhist and non-buddhist, take part in the celebration. These include people from the Thai communities, most of whom are originally from the Northeastern region of Thailand and who share many cultures and traditions with Lao people.

Lao Bang Fai on display in the National Air and Space Museum
Mr. Frank H. Winter, curator of Rocketry Division of the National Air and Space Museum stated that: “Lao Rocket is special and unique that has a thousand years of traditional celebration associated with this great looking rocket. It would be wonderful to have a Lao Rocket on display in the National Air and Space Museum so that the public can learn from it.” In 2005, Lao Bang Fai was chosen to be displayed along with many great artifacts from various countries at the National Air and Space Museum in Chantilly, Virginia. The National Air and Space Museum is a part of the Smithsonian Institution of the United States of America.

The deputy abbot of Wat Lao Buddhavong in Virginia acknowledged that “this event is historic and brings recognition and visibility that all Laotians can be proud of”.

Furthermore, anthropologist Charles Keyes talked about the exhibit of the Lao Bun Bang Fai at the Burke Museum of Natural History and Culture, in Seattle, Washington State in 1998. The Lao community wished to make the exhibit more than a commemoration of something only remembered about life in Laos and, especially, to make the Bun Bang Fai a reality to the Lao community living in Seattle. So, Bun Bang Fai was launched in 1994 by the Lao community to adapt to the Seattle milieu and has been celebrated each year since. The religious ceremonies are performed inside the Museum followed by the procession of Bang Fai with traditional music and dance moving from the Museum through the campus of the University of Washington.

Overall, the celebration of Bun Bang Fai helps promote the unity and friendship within and among village communities in Laos and among Lao communities living abroad. Furthermore, Pinwadee Srisupun who did her PhD research on Bun Bang fai at Khon Kaen University, in the Northeastern region of Thailand, stated that: “Within Thailand, Isan people who have emigrated to other regions of Thailand, conscious of their homeland, still choose to celebrate the Bun Bang Fai. The event reflects both traditional beliefs and newly assimilated cultural elements. These examples show how Bun Bang Fai is always prominent in Lao consciousness in contexts where they are enacting their ethnic identities.”.

Present day in Northeastern Thailand

Villages no longer stage "Bun Bang Fai" festivals on the scale of Yasothon's famous event.  However, villages may have floats conveying government messages. They may also include fairs. In recent years the Tourism Authority of Thailand has helped promote these events, particularly the festivals in the Thai provinces of Nong Khai and Yasothon, the latter boasting the largest and most elaborate of these festivals. The Bun bang fai celebration in the past and up till now are not only in Yasothorn, but also in many other provinces in Isan, such as Roi Et, Kalasin, Srisaket, Mahasarakham and Udon Thani. In Suwannaphum of Roi Et Province is one of the most magnificent and beautiful of Thailand's Bang Fai parades that is called "Bang fai eh" or "Bangfai ko" (Bang Fai Parade are decorated in the form of Thai traditional artwork or Line Thai).

Yasothon's festival

Since the March 1, 1972, separation of Yasothon from Ubon Ratchathani Province, with its world-famous Candle Festival, Yasothon's provincial capital has elaborately staged its now one of three famous Rocket Festival in Thailand ( Yasothon, Suwannaphume, and Phanom Prai both are locate in Roi Et province ) annually over the Friday, Saturday, and Sunday weekend that falls in the middle of May.

Raw Friday (Wan Sook Dip) features all-night performances of Mor Lam Sing (Thai–Isan: หมอลำซิ่ง),  which continue intermittently into the early hours of Monday. Mor Lam Sing is a type of morlam that is very popular among the local Isan-Lao population. The performance goes on all night and the locals have great fun. Outsiders have a hard time understanding the humor, which is often rather bawdy.

Saturday brings on the competitions for Hae Bangfai Ko . 
"Hàe" are street parades or demonstrations usually featuring traditional dance and accompanying musicians, typically with khaen, Gongs, Lao-Isan Klong Yao, long drum), and an electric guitar, powered by an inverter and car batteries in a handcart that also mounts horn loudspeakers.
Bangfai Ko  are richly decorated rockets mounted on traditional but highly decorated oxcarts, or modern floats.  Most but not all bold Bangfai Ko  are for show and not actually capable of flight. Many sport the heads of Nāgas; if equipped with water pumps and swivels, they are actually capable of spitting on spectators.

The principal theme of any Hae Bangfai is the Phadaeng and Nang Ai legend (below), so many floats (or highly decorated oxcarts) also depict the couple and their retinue. Other modern themes present as well, as suggested by Keyes (ibid.) Participating groups compete for prizes within their categories. Hàe typically end in a wat, where dancers and accompanying musicians may further compete in traditional folk dance. All groups prominently display the names of their major sponsors.

Recalling the fertility rite origins of the festival, parade ornaments and floats often sport phallic symbols and imagery. Amid the festive atmosphere, dirty humour is widespread.

Festivities also include cross-dressing, both cross-sex and cross-generational, and great quantities of alcohol. Perhaps the most popular beverage, both because it is cheaper than beer and has a higher, 40-percent alcohol content, is a neutral grain spirit called Sura, but more generally known as Lao Whiskey (Lao lao) in Laos and Lao Khao (white alcohol) in Thailand. Sato, a brewed rice beverage similar to Japanese sake, may also be on offer; sweet-flavored sato may be as little as seven-percent alcohol, but it packs a surprising punch.

Sunday competition moves on to the launching of Bangfai, judged, in various categories, for apparent height and distance travelled, with extra points for exceptionally beautiful vapour trails Those whose rockets misfire are either covered with mud, or thrown into a mud puddle (that also serves a safety function, as immediate application of cooling mud can reduce severity of burns).  While popular and entertaining, the festival is also dangerous, with participants and spectators alike occasionally being injured or even killed.  On 9 May 1999, a Lan 120 kg rocket exploded 50 meters above ground, just two seconds after launch, killing four persons and wounding 11.

Roi Et's festival

Bang Fai Festival is traditional of Isan and Laotian peoples culture that could be found this festival throughout a country where living place of Northeastern Thai people. In Roi Et province have two places which widely known and favorite festival in term of the most number of Bang Fai Ei or Bang Fai decorated car in Thailand in Suwannaphume district. In Suwannaphume not only found the number of the most beautiful Bang Fai and the most number of beautiful Bang Fai parade dance by dramatic art collage student but also the only one community that made and Bang Fai decoration by a papers cutting technique call "Lai Sri Phume". In the other hand Roi Et province is well known for Isan peoples which the most favorite in term of originally of local culture with preserve traditional pattern of Bang Fai Festival and the most number of Rocket or Bang Fai in the world in Phanom Prai both are locate in Roi Et province. Today the beautiful Bang Fai float car which show in Yasothon Bang Fai Festival 8 in 9 float cars are made in Roi Et province ( At Samat District, Selaphume District, Thawat Buri District, et al.) and them rent form Roi Et more than 40 years ago.

Bang Fai (the rockets)

Jaruat is the proper term for rockets used as missiles or weapons, but Bang Fai skyrockets are gigantic black-powder bottle rockets. Tiny bottle rockets are so-called because they may be launched from a bottle. In the case of the similar appearing Bang Fai, also spelled 'Bong Fai', the 'bottle' is a bong, a section of bamboo culm used as a container or pipe (and only colloquially as a pipe for smoking marijuana.)

Related to the Chinese Fire Arrow, Bang Fai are made from bamboo bongs. Most contemporary ones, however, are enclosed in PVC piping, making them less dangerous by standardizing their sizes and black-powder charges (which contest rules require be compounded by the rocketeers, themselves). Baking or boiling a bong kills insect eggs that otherwise hatch in dead bamboo and eat it, inside out. Skipping this step may cause the bong to disintegrate and melt the PVC piping. Vines tie long bamboo tails to launching racks. The time it takes for the exhaust to burn through the vines (usually) allows a motor to build up to full thrust; then the tails impart in-flight stability. Ignition comes from a burning fuse or electric match.

Bang Fai come in various sizes, competing in several categories. Small ones are called Bang Fai Noi. Larger categories are designated by the counting words for 10,000, 100,000 and 1,000,000:  Meun "Saen" and the largest Bang Fai, the Lan. These counting words see use in many contexts to indicate increasing size or value. Lan in this context may be taken to mean extremely large as well as extremely expensive and extremely dangerous:  Bang Fai Lan are nine metres long and charged with 120 kg of black powder. These may reach altitudes reckoned in kilometres, and travel dozens of kilometres down range (loosely speaking, as they can go in any direction, including right through the crowd). Competing rockets are scored for apparent height, distance, and beauty of the vapour trail. A few include skyrocket pyrotechnics. A few also include parachutes for tail assemblies, but most fall where they may.

Folk tales

Nang Ai, Phadaeng, and Phangkhi

Nang Ai, in full,  Nang Ai Kham is queen of the pageant and Phadaeng is her champion.  She is famed as the most beautiful girl. He, an outsider, comes to see for himself, lavishes her with gifts and wins her heart; but must win a rocket festival tournament to win her hand. Unwittingly, he becomes part of a love triangle.
Phangkhi and Nang Ai have been fated by their karma to have been reborn throughout many past existences as soul mates (Lao-Isan  .) Stories about the couple, however, say they have not exactly been lovers: in many a past existence, she has been a dutiful wife, but would not yield an inch in an argument to anyone and he only wanted to satisfy himself. She becomes fed up and prays never to be paired with him, ever again. Nang Ai is reborn as the daughter of Phraya Khom ((which means Lord Khmer; but even if her father was a Cambodian overlord, Nang Ai Kham is still the genuine article), while Phangki is reborn as the son of Phaya Nak, the Grand Nāga who rules the Deeps. (He is depicted in parades in the guise of a prince, riding alone, dogging the new pair.) Phangki isn't invited to the tournament, and Phadaeng's rocket fizzles. Nang Ai's uncle is the winner, so her father calls the whole thing off, which is considered to be a very bad omen, indeed. Pangkhii shape-shifts into a white squirrel to spy on Nang Ai, but she espies him and has him killed by a royal hunter. Pangkhii's flesh magically transforms into meat equal to 8,000 cartloads. Nang Ai and many of her countrymen ate of this tainted flesh, and Phaya Nak vows to allow no one to remain living who had eaten of the flesh of his son. Aroused from the Deeps, he and his watery myrmidons rise and turn the land into a vast swamp. Nagas personify waters running both above and below ground, and nagas run amok are rivers in spate: all Isan is flooded. 
Phadaeng flees the rising flood with Nang Ai on his white stallion, Bak Sam, but she is swept off by a Naga's tail, not to be seen again. (Bak Sam is seen in parades sporting his stallion's equipage that legend says dug a lick called Lam Huay Sam (which may be seen to this day in Ban Sammo-Nonthan, Tambon Pho Chai, Amphoe Khok Pho Chai. The legend also tells that receding waters left behind the Nong Han Kumphawapi Lake of the Kumphawapi District marsh, which, too, may be seen to this very day.) Phadaeng escapes, but pines away for his lost love. His ghost then raises an army of the spirits of the air to wage war on the nagas below. The war continues until both sides are exhausted, and the dispute is submitted to King Wetsawan, king of the North, for arbitration. His decision: the cause of the feud has long since been forgotten and all disputants must let bygones be bygone.

The legend is retold in many regional variations, all of which are equally true for they relate events in different existences. One 3000-word poem translated to English from this rich Thai-Isan tradition, "…is especially well known to the Thai audience, having been designated as secondary school supplementary reading by the Thai Ministry of Education, with publication in 1978. There is even a Thai popular song about the leading characters."  The original was written in a Lao-Isan verse called Khong saan, replete with sexual innuendo, puns, and double entendre.

Keyes (op. cit., p. 67, citing George Coedès) p. 48, says "Phra Daeng Nang Ai" is a version of the Kaundinya, legendary founder of Funan; and Soma, the daughter of the king of the Nāga. Keyes also wrote that such legends may prove a valuable source of toponyms.

The Myth of the Toad King
Almost everyone, native and visitor alike, will say Bang Fai are launched to bring rain, as in the Tourism Authority of Thailand link, below. However, a careful reading of the underlying myth, as presented in Yasothon and Nong Khai, implies the opposite: the rains bring on the rockets. Their version of the myth:

When the Lord Buddha was in his Bodhisattva (Pali) (phothisat) incarnation as King of the Toads Phaya Khang Khok, and married to Udon Khuruthawip (Northern Partner-Knowing-Continent), his sermons drew everyone, creatures and sky-dwellers alike, away from Phaya Thaen, King of the Sky). Angry Phaya Thaen withheld life-giving rains from the earth for seven years, seven months and seven days. Acting against the advice of the Toad King, Phaya Naga, King of the Nāga (and personification of the Mekong) declared war on Phaya Thaen—and lost.

Persuaded by Phaya Naga to assume command, King Toad enlisted the aid of termites to build mounds reaching to the heavens, and of venomous scorpions and centipedes to attack Phaya Thaen's feet, and of hornets for air support. Previous attempts at aerial warfare against Phaya Thaen in his own element had proved futile; but even the Sky must come down to the ground. On the ground the war was won, and Phaya Thaen sued for peace.

Naga Rockets fired in the air at the end of the hot, dry season are not to threaten Phaya Thaen, but to serve as a reminder to him of his treaty obligations made to Lord Bodhisatta Phaya Khang Khok, King of the Toads, down on the ground. For his part Phaya Nak was rewarded by being given the duty of Honor Guard at most Thai and Lao temples.

After the harvest of the resulting crops, Wow thanoo (bow kite), man-sized kites with a strung bow, are staked out in winter monsoon winds. They are also called Túi-tiù (singing kite), from the sound of the bowstring singing in the wind, which sing all through the night, to signal Phaya Thaen that he has sent enough rain.

All participants (including a wow thanoo) were depicted on murals on the front of the former Yasothon Municipal Bang Fai Museum, but were removed when it was remodeled as a learning center.

An English-language translation of a Thai report on Bang Fai Phaya Nark Naga fireballs at Nong Khai gives essentially the same myth (without the hornets and wow) from Thai folk: The knowledge of Thai life-style .
For an alternate English-language version, see Tossa, Wajuppa and Phra 'Ariyānuwat ; Phya Khankhaak, the Toad King: A Translation of an Isan Fertility Myth in Verse; Lewisburg: Bucknell University Press London ; Cranbury, NJ : Associated University Presses ©1996 .

Etymology
 Bun merit (Buddhism) is from Pali Puñña merit, meritorious action, virtue, and Sanskrit पुण्य puṇya virtuous or meritorious act, good or virtuous works.
 Bang (alternative spelling  bong บ้อง,) is a cutting, specifically of bamboo.
 Fai, is Fire (classical element).
 Prapheni ), tradition, is from Sanskrit परंपर parampara, an uninterrupted series, regular series, succession 'to be handed down in regular succession'; from Pali paraṁparā 7795 paraṁparā series, tradition.

In popular culture
The 2006 Thai martial arts film, Kon Fai Bin, depicts the Rocket Festival. Set in 1890s Siam, the movie's hero, Jone Bang Fai ("Fireball Bandit"), is an expert at building the traditional bamboo rockets, which he uses in conjunction with Muay Thai martial arts to defeat his opponents.

Thai political protests in April 2010 similarly had Red Shirts firing  in downtown Bangkok.

See also

 Chinese Fire Arrow for Flying Firelances, bamboo tubes stuffed with black powder; the tube was ignited and used as a flamethrower.
 Black powder
 Gift economy
 Mysorean rockets — military weapons
 Phaya Naga
 Phi Ta Khon ghost festival — includes a rocket festival
 Phra Lak Phra Lam
 Skyrocket
 Thai folklore

References and notes

Gray, Paul and Ridout, Lucy.  Rough Guide to Thailand.  Rough Guides, 2004.  .
Tourist Authority of Thailand

Further reading

Videos
A video and a brief description about the Rocket Festival in Northeast Thailand (Issan, Esarn) can be seen from http://www.spatz-darmstadt.de (section "Asian Cultures" / "Ethnographic Videos" / "Thai,Lao Cultural Festivals"
)

Buddhist festivals in Thailand
Buddhist holidays
Buddhist festivals in Laos
Fireworks competitions
Isan culture
Thai folklore
Rocketry
Tourist attractions in Yasothon province
Fireworks events in Asia
Animals in Buddhism